Jim Bedard may refer to:

Jim Bedard (ice hockey, born 1927) (1927–1994), Canadian ice hockey player
Jim Bedard (ice hockey, born 1956), Canadian ice hockey player